Italy competed at the 1997 World Championships in Athletics in Athens, Greece from 1 to 10 August 1997.

Medalists

Finalists
The largest team of the Italy national athletics team (66 competitors) of ever time at the World Championships, ranked 6th (with 16 finalists) in the IAAF placing table. Rank obtained by assigning eight points in the first place and so on to the eight finalists.

Results
Italy participated with 66 athletes by winning three medals.

Men (40)

Women (26)

References

External links
 The “Azzurri” at the World Championships (from 1983 to 2009)

Nations at the 1997 World Championships in Athletics
World Championships in Athletics
Italy at the World Championships in Athletics